The North American Youth Chess Championship (NAYCC) is an annual chess tournament for participants under 18, first held in 2004 in Boca Raton, Florida.  The tournament has 6 age brackets, in two-year increments, from U8 (under 8) to U18.  For each age bracket, there is an open championship and a separate championship for girls. Since at least 2015, there is also a blitz tournament.  

In 2021, it was held in Chicago, Illinois.  The reigning U18 champions are Dimitar Mardov (Open), Alice Lee (Girls), and Nico Chasin (Blitz).

See also
African Junior Chess Championship
Asian Junior Chess Championship
European Junior Chess Championship
European Youth Chess Championship
Pan American Junior Chess Championship

References

Chess competitions
Youth sports competitions